Triumph Palace (transliterated as Triumf Palas) is the tallest apartment building in Moscow and all of Europe. It is sometimes called the Eighth Sister because it is similar in appearance to the Seven Sisters skyscrapers built in Moscow under Joseph Stalin through the 1950s. Construction began in 2001 and was completed in 2006.

The 57-storey building, containing about 1,000 luxury apartments , was topped out on 20 December 2003, making it Europe's and Russia's tallest skyscraper at  until the inauguration in 2007 of Moscow's 268-metre Naberezhnaya Tower block C.

Triumph Palace is featured in detail in the 2009 Channel 4 series Vertical City (series 1, episode 8).

See also
List of skyscrapers
List of skyscrapers in Europe

References

External links
 

Apartment buildings
Residential skyscrapers in Moscow
Buildings and structures completed in 2006